The Society of Arts and Crafts of NSW is a guild of artists in New South Wales, Australia established in 1906 by 6 craftspeople
The Society held its first exhibition in 1907 and annually into the 1930s, with exhibitions of metalwork, jewellery, pottery, china painting, weaving, embroidery and pokerwork.

References

External links
 

Organisations based in New South Wales
1906 establishments in Australia
Organizations established in 1906